Kuzovatovo is the name of several inhabited localities in Kuzovatovsky District of Ulyanovsk Oblast, Russia.

Urban localities
Kuzovatovo (urban locality), a work settlement in Kuzovatovsky Settlement Okrug

Rural localities
Kuzovatovo (rural locality), a selo in Koromyslovsky Rural Okrug